Black Peak may refer to the following mountains:

 Black Peak (Vitosha), in the Vitosha Massif, Bulgaria
 Black Peak (Šar Mountains), in the Šar Mountains, Kosovo
 Black Peak (Pohorje), in the Pohorje mountains, Slovenia
 Black Peak (Alaska), a volcano in Alaska, US
 Black Peak (Chigmit Mountains), in Alaska, US
 Black Peak (Washington), in the Cascade Range, Washington State, US
 Kalanag, also known as Black Peak, in the Himalayas
 Piz Nair, Black Peak in Romansh, a mountain of the Albula Alps in Switzerland